Leonel Cunha Guerra (born 20 June 1987), known as Lio, is a Portuguese football player who plays for Montalegre.

Club career
He made his professional debut in the Segunda Liga for Freamunde on 12 August 2012 in a game against União da Madeira.

References

1987 births
Living people
People from Chaves, Portugal
Portuguese footballers
Portuguese expatriate footballers
Expatriate footballers in Luxembourg
Portuguese expatriate sportspeople in Luxembourg
US Sandweiler players
F.C. Tirsense players
S.C. Freamunde players
Liga Portugal 2 players
GD Bragança players
G.D. Gafanha players
C.D.C. Montalegre players
Association football midfielders
Sportspeople from Vila Real District